Restrepia elegans, commonly called the elegant restrepia, is a species of orchid occurring from Colombia to northwestern Venezuela.

References

External links 

elegans
Orchids of Colombia
Orchids of Venezuela